This is a timeline of the Türgesh.

7th century

8th century

References

Bibliography 

 

 Xue, Zongzheng (薛宗正). (1992). Turkic peoples (突厥史). Beijing: 中国社会科学出版社. ; OCLC 28622013

Turkic timelines